Shirley Ethel Haig (born 12 August 1950) is a retired field hockey player from New Zealand, who was a member of the national team that finished sixth at the 1984 Summer Olympics in Los Angeles, California. She was born in East Gore.

External links
 
 New Zealand Olympic Committee
 

New Zealand female field hockey players
Olympic field hockey players of New Zealand
Field hockey players at the 1984 Summer Olympics
1950 births
Living people
People from Gore, New Zealand
20th-century New Zealand women
21st-century New Zealand women